Grand Boulevard is a thoroughfare in Detroit, running east to west in some places and north to south in other places and is approximately 11 miles in length.  It once constituted the city limits of Detroit. Grand Boulevard is named the "Berry Gordy Jr. Boulevard" in the area where the Motown Historical Museum is located and the "General Motors Boulevard" in the area of Detroit's "New Center" where the Fisher Building and Cadillac Place (formerly the General Motors Building) are located. Grand Boulevard is commonly referred to by residents of the city simply as "the Boulevard".

History 

As early as 1876, Bela Hubbard and other Detroiters were cognizant of the efforts of Baron Georges-Eugène Haussmann to make Paris into a beautiful city by designing parks, broad streets, and grand boulevards.

These citizens proposed adopting Haussmann's concepts by surrounding Detroit with its own "Grand Boulevard."  When Belle Isle was transferred from the state to the city of Detroit, Michigan legislator James Randall included a rider calling for the construction of this Grand Boulevard. However, the city government refused to begin work on the road right away, although a few people built homes along the Boulevard's proposed route.

Finally, in 1891, Detroit mayor Hazen S. Pingree supported the idea and broke ground on the construction of Grand Boulevard, a ring road that wrapped around the city of Detroit. The Boulevard was originally thought to represent the absolute limit of the city's expansion, although tremendous growth at the beginning of the 20th century quickly pushed the city limits far beyond Grand Boulevard to its north, its east, and its west.

By 1913, Grand Boulevard was completed, encircling the central most and oldest portion of the city. It was generally recognized as a major attraction of the city; the entire length was decorated with trees, shrubbery, and flowerbeds.

By the early 1980s, to accommodate construction of a new General Motors plant, portions of East Grand Boulevard were reconfigured. This was part of a controversial use of eminent domain by the City of Detroit which allowed for demolition of a substantial portion of the nearby Poletown neighborhood in order to make way for the plant. The controversy sparked opposition within the neighborhood. The Michigan Supreme Court, in the 1981 case of Poletown Neighborhood Council v. City of Detroit, settled the matter by ruling that the project did constitute a legitimate use of eminent domain authority and that the evictions could proceed.

Many years ago, the streetcar route which traveled along much of Grand Boulevard, as well as on neighboring streets parallel to Grand Boulevard, was formally called the "Grand Belt" line because of Grand Boulevard's belt-like configuration around the most central part of Detroit. The subsequent bus route which likewise traveled on some, but not all, of Grand Boulevard retained the "Grand Belt" name until a service cut in 2009 eliminated that public transit coverage entirely.

Landmarks

See also

Outer Drive

References 

Streets in Michigan
Transportation in Detroit